Udinsk (Khakhirai Ürtöö) is a rural locality (a selo) in Khorinsky District, Republic of Buryatia, Russia. The population was 719 as of 2010. There are 10 streets.

Geography 
Udinsk is located 43 km west of Khorinsk (the district's administrative centre) by road. Tarbagatay is the nearest rural locality.

References 

Rural localities in Khorinsky District